Paoli, Incorporated is a manufacturer of wood office furniture. It was founded in 1926, and is located in Orleans, Indiana. As an operating company of HNI Corporation, Paoli’s sister companies are The HON Company, Allsteel, Gunlocke, Heatilator, Heat & Glo, and Quadra-Fire. The company has showrooms across the United States.

History 
Paoli, Inc. was first organized in July 1926 by Samuel Elsby, Sr. as a consolidation of the previous Orleans Cabinet Company and the Paoli Furniture Company. This new organization started out as the Paoli Chair Company and was located in Paoli, Indiana. The main products manufactured were footstools, vanity benches, and dining room suites complete with chairs.

When the Great Depression hit, Samuel J Elsby, Jr., who was then serving as the Secretary-Treasurer, suggested creating a line of occasional chairs targeted towards the consumer market. These occasional chairs were successful at the Chicago furniture market show. The company then began putting a focus on additional occasional chairs, which in turn, kept Paoli alive through the depression.

In 1951, Samuel Elsby, Jr. became president of Paoli Chair Company. By 1954, Paoli employed 300 people and became the largest manufacturer of occasional chairs in the world. Their success continued into the 1960s and led to two plant expansions. Soon after the expansion and modernization was complete, Samuel Elsby, Jr. died at age 60. His sons, Robert Elsby and Sam Elsby III, stepped up to keep the business prospering. Not long after, the family sold the company to two investors named Joseph Wulfman and Sherman Heazlitt. Robert Elsby stayed with the company as President after it was sold, and ran the company until 1986.

By the end of the 1970s, Paoli made the switch from the residential chair market to the commercial furniture market.  As Paoli contracted with other furniture manufacturers to produce desks, the company purchased property in neighboring Orleans, Indiana to build a warehouse to store the desks. Then in 1982, Paoli began making its own desk and case goods products at the new site in Orleans. Because of success in the commercial furniture market, Heazlitt and Wulfman adopted the new name Paoli, Inc.

Joseph Wulfman retired and sold his share of Paoli, Inc. to Sherman Heazlitt in 1986. Heazlitt became CEO and Thomas A. Talone became the 5th president of the company. Two years later, Heazlitt sold Paoli, Inc. to Klaussner Furniture Industries of Asheboro, North Carolina. Through the 1990s, the company flourished, expanded, and moved all production and administration to a modern facility built in Orleans, Indiana. In 1999, Paoli, Inc. purchased Whitehall Furniture, an established manufacturer of quality seating.

In 2004, Paoli, Inc. was acquired by HNI Corporation, the second largest office furniture manufacturer.  From 2007 - 2009, Dave Gardner served as president. In January 2010, Brandon Sieben became president and served until December 2013 when he re-located to another position within the HNI Corporation. He is now the acting President of Allsteel, Inc. John Cahill is the current president of Paoli. On October 7, 2016 HNI Corporation announced consolidation of its manufacturing facilities, resulting in the closing and relocation of Orleans, IN manufacturing.

Products 
Paoli, Inc. provides contemporary, traditional, and transitional casegoods, along with management and guest seating for private offices.  Lounge seating for public spaces, conferencing, and reception seating are available as well.

Sustainability & Environmental Responsibility 
Paoli’s furniture is constructed by maximizing utilization of wood that results in superior strength and enhanced use of the wood. American hardwoods such as cherry, sycamore, maple, and beech have been a key resource for Paoli’s building materials. The company is also an advocate for recycling in their community as well as their business and has increased the recycled content of packing materials. Paoli’s products have received awards including:
 BIFMA level certification to the BIFMA e3 2008 Sustainability Standard for seating and wood casegoods at level 1 and laminate casegoods at level 2.
IAQ certifications for their air quality from the SCS Indoor Advantage in conformance with the ANSI/BIFMA Furniture Emissions Standard for private offices
 contributes to customer’s awards from the U.S. Green Building Council through the Leadership in Energy and Environmental Design (LEED) Green Building Rating System.

Commitment to Safety 
Paoli places a focus on safety. These are a few of their accomplishments in safety:
 In the past ten years their recordable injury rate has decreased from 10.01 to 0.80.
 In 2009, Paoli set an all-time record for an HNI operating company with the fewest recordable injuries (3) and recordable injury rate (0.78).
 On June 10, 2010 Paoli became the fourth wood office furniture manufacturer in America to become a member of the OSHA VPP program.
 Paoli is the 55th company in the state of Indiana to become a member of the OSHA VPP program (out of 145,000 companies in the state) and is the only HNI operating company to be accepted into the program.
 In 2011 Paoli employees received Indiana Senate Resolution 3542 which recognized their safety record.

References

External links 
 www.paoli.com

Furniture companies of the United States